Elmwood Township is located in Peoria County, Illinois, United States. As of the 2010 census, its population was 2,598 and it contained 1,094 housing units.

Geography

Demographics

References

External links
 US Census
 City-data.com
 Illinois State Archives

Townships in Peoria County, Illinois
Peoria metropolitan area, Illinois
Townships in Illinois